Papushino is a rural locality (a village) in Domshinskoye Rural Settlement, Sheksninsky District, Vologda Oblast, Russia. The population was 15 as of 2002.

Geography 
Papushino is located 45 km southeast of Sheksna (the district's administrative centre) by road. Svetilovo is the nearest rural locality.

References 

Rural localities in Sheksninsky District